Broadcasting in East Germany was performed by two organisations.

 Deutscher Fernsehfunk, the East German television organisation also known as Fernsehen der DDR
 Rundfunk der DDR, the East German radio organisation